Oxford Universities Quidditch Club (OUQC) is the quidditch club of both the University of Oxford and Oxford Brookes University. It is composed of two teams: a first team, the Radcliffe Chimeras, and a reserve second team, the Quidlings. Both teams are official QuidditchUK (QUK) teams. QUK is the UK quidditch governing body, and is a constituent part of the International Quidditch Association (IQA).

The club was formed as Oxford Quidditch on the 20th November, 2011 and adopted its current name in 2013. The club has seen much success, with the Radcliffe Chimeras a substantial amount of national and international titles. These include the first annual British Quidditch Cup, and the most recent European Quidditch Cup, in late 2013 and early 2014. Both teams compete in the season-long competition organised by QuidditchUK called The Challenge Shield, the first matches of were played in September 2014.

The club played in Worcester College for six months, before moving to a permanent marked out field in Oxford's University Parks in May 2012, which remains their current home.

History

Early days 

The first incarnation of Oxford University's muggle quidditch team came into being on 20 November 2011. Angus Barry organised a match between Worcester College and St Edmund Hall held in the extensive grounds of Worcester. Rules were loose and almost non-existent, with St Edmund Hall winning the majority of games played. Following complaints from the groundsmen of Worcester College, play quickly moved from Worcester College to the University Parks. Other colleges (notably at that point University College and Mansfield College) also joined the emerging group of teams within the university. The standard rulebook of the International Quidditch Association was officially adopted during the Trinity (summer) term of 2012.

After the Global Games were held in Oxford in 2012, Oxford organised its first match against another university, defeating Reading in a home fixture on 24 November 2012. A few months later, Oxford played Leicester in another home fixture in University Parks, and won all three matches played by scores of 90-40*, 60-40*, and 120*-40. This was followed by Oxford's first tournament success, claiming the Highlander Cup in March 2013 after winning against Bangor in near-unplayable weather conditions in Edinburgh.

A new order and the first British Champions 

The Whiteknights Tournament in Reading saw the Radcliffe Chimeras take first place, whilst the Quidlings struggled, finishing last. Along with the adoption of a two-team structure, the executive committee structure was also changed, with Ashley Cooper taking over from founder Angus Barry as captain of the Radcliffe Chimeras, as well as being installed as the club's first president.

This change was followed by the inaugural British Quidditch Cup in November 2013. Hosted in Oxford, at the University Parks, the British Quidditch Cup was the first national championship within the United Kingdom, and sixteen teams, including the Radcliffe Chimeras and the Quidlings, took part. After a successful recruitment drive at the start of the academic year, the Quidlings, despite an early loss to the Leicester Lovegoods, defeated the Norwich Nifflers and the Chester Chasers to reach the quarter-finals of the Cup, only for them to be knocked out of the tournament 100*-0 by Southampton. Southampton were themselves beaten in the semi-finals by the Radcliffe Chimeras, with a final score of 110*-0 (with the asterisk denoting the snitch catch), after finishing top of their group, going on to become the first British Champions after beating Keele University in the final with a score of 110–60*.

International success and building for the future 

On 1 and 2 February 2014, the two teams of Oxford University Quidditch Club played their first international matches. Travelling to Brussels to take part in the 2014 European Quidditch Cup, they hoped to make their mark on the world of international quidditch. The Quidlings won two of their three group games, almost snatching a space at the IQA World Cup, before losing out to Brundisi Lunatica in the play-off match. However, the Chimeras lived up to their now extensive reputation, only losing one game (against Paris Frog) on their way to a final against Paris Phénix. Although losing their Keeper, Luke Twist, to a red card in the last few minutes of the match after he'd made important contributions to their leading scoreline at that point, the Chimeras powered on to defeat Paris 100*-30 with a spectacular snitch grab from volunteer seeker Steffan Danino, claiming the title of European Champions.
Returning from their exploits on the continent, the club set about hosting a mercenary tournament, the Valentines Cup, in South Park, Oxford. This took place on 22 and 23 February, and was the largest tournament of this nature to take place outside of the United States, with over 160 players taking part. The organisers of the event, Luke Twist and Jasiek Mikolajczak, were later nominated as Radcliffe Chimeras captain and President respectively, following the announcement that Ashley Cooper would not be continuing his time as president or captain. The Quidlings captaincy was taken over by Jack Lennard.

Nine OUQC players were included in the squad of twenty-one that represented the United Kingdom at the 2014 Global Games in Vancouver, British Columbia, Canada. In 2016, the Chimeras regained their national champion placing in the British Quidditch Cup, held 19–20 March.

Results 

Radcliffe Chimeras (including results from before the formation of the two-team system)

Quidlings

References

External links 
Oxford University Quidditch Club Official Website

Quidditch teams
Quidditch
Sports clubs established in 2011
2011 establishments in England